Wat That Noi ("Temple of the Little Reliquary") is a ruined temple of the Wiang Kum Kam archaeological area, outside of Chiang Mai in northern Thailand, so named because of its relatively restricted scale.

It is adjacent to Wat Chang Kham, a larger site in the same group.

See also
Wiang Kum Kam

References

 Oliver Hargreave: Exploring Chiang Mai, City, Valley & Mountains. Within Books, 4th Edition, 2013. 

That Noi
History of Chiang Mai